Juan Ugarte Aiestarán (born 7 November 1980) is a Spanish retired footballer who played as a striker.

Club career
Born in San Sebastián, Gipuzkoa, Ugarte was brought up in local giants Real Sociedad's youth system, but only appeared once for the first team during his two-year spell as a senior. Released in 2002, he would also be very unfortunate at Basque neighbours SD Eibar – one match played in Segunda División.

In the following years, Ugarte played with Segunda División B sides Real Unión and Barakaldo CF, also in his native region. In early 2004, after an unsuccessful trial at Wycombe Wanderers, he moved to Dorchester Town until he was acquired by Wrexham, scoring his first goal for the latter in the Football League Trophy quarter-final tie against local rivals Chester City; he finished the year as that competition's top scorer, notably netting in the final against Southend United (2–0).

Ugarte scored regularly during his time with the Welsh club, but this was not enough to avoid relegation to Football League Two after it had suffered a ten-point deduction for entering administration. On 5 March 2005, he put five past Hartlepool United in a 6–4 away win. This remains the record for most away goals scored by a single player in the English professional league.

Ugarte then joined another team in Football League One, Crewe Alexandra, but injuries prevented him from ever starting a game for them, also continuing to affect him during two loan returns to Wrexham. Despite his condition, the Dragons re-signed him in November 2006, but he only made three official appearances over two seasons, retiring at the age of 27.

Personal life
Ugarte was best friends with Xabi Alonso, who also emerged through Real Sociedad's youth ranks.

Honours

Club
Wrexham
Football League Trophy: 2004–05

Individual
Football League One Player of the Month: March 2005

References

External links

1980 births
Living people
Spanish footballers
Footballers from San Sebastián
Association football forwards
La Liga players
Segunda División players
Segunda División B players
Antiguoko players
Real Sociedad B footballers
Real Sociedad footballers
SD Eibar footballers
Real Unión footballers
Barakaldo CF footballers
English Football League players
Dorchester Town F.C. players
Wrexham A.F.C. players
Crewe Alexandra F.C. players
Spanish expatriate footballers
Expatriate footballers in England
Expatriate footballers in Wales
Spanish expatriate sportspeople in England
Spanish expatriate sportspeople in Wales